(plural , romanized:  or Old Arabic [t͡sˤaˈloːh] , ( or Old Arabic  [t͡sˤaˈloːtʰ] in construct state) ), also known as  and also spelled , are prayers performed by Muslims. Some Muslims pray without standing.  is composed of prescribed repetitive cycles of bows and prostrations, called . The number of s, also known as units of prayer, varies from prayer to prayer.

The daily obligatory prayers collectively form the second of the five pillars in Islam, observed three or five times (the latter being the majority) every day at prescribed times. Special prayers are exclusively performed in congregation, such as the Friday prayer and the Eid prayers, and may be coupled with two sermons each, delivered by the imam.

Etymology
 is an Arabic word that means to pray. The word is used primarily by English speakers only to refer to the five obligatory prayers of Islam.

The origin of the word  has become a matter of debate, particularly in relation to Quranism. Some have suggested that  derives from the root  which means "linking things together", hence why the obligatory prayers in Islam are referred to by the word  (in the sense that through prayer one "connects" to God). In some translations, namely that of Rashad Khalifa,  is translated as the "Contact Prayer" either because of the physical contact the head makes with the ground during the prostration part of the ritual, or again because the prayer "connects" the one who performs it to God.

Other sources claim that the root is in fact  the ultimate meaning of which is not agreed upon.

 is thought to come from the Classical Syriac word  meaning prayer, temple, sanctuary or the theological idea of reconciliation in Christianity.  itself is believed to derive from the root  which is related to bending or bowing down.

Those who argue for this interpretation often refer to verse 33:56 of the Quran which states that "Allah and His Angels  upon the Prophet". They argue that such verses demonstrate the conventional understanding of salah to be inconsistent and in this case blasphemous as the idea of Allah praying to Muhammad (or indeed praying at all) is at odds with the Quran's message of strict monotheism.

In the Quran 
The noun  is used 83 times in the Quran.

There are about 15 other derivatives of its triliteral root ṣ-l. "Surely my prayer, and my sacrifice and my life and my death are (all) for God", and "I am Allah, there is no god but I, therefore serve Me and keep up prayer for My remembrance" are both examples of this.

Religious significance

Via , a believer can grow closer to Allah and in turn strengthen their faith; it is believed that the soul requires prayer and closeness to God to stay sustained and healthy, and that prayer spiritually sustains the human soul.

First, in order to commend God, God's servants, together with the angels, do  ("blessing, salutations"). Second,  is done involuntarily by all beings in creation, in the sense that they are always in contact with God by virtue of him creating and sustaining them. Third, Muslims voluntarily offer  to reveal that it is the particular form of worship that belongs to the prophets. Fourth,  is described as the second pillar of Islam.

Procedure

Each prayer may consist of two to four . Each  consists of specific movements and recitations. On the major elements there is consensus, but on minor details there may be different views. Between each position there is a very slight pause. The phrase , is recited when moving from one position to another.

Beginning 
Before prayer, a Muslim should always perform , an act in which the hands are first washed, the mouth and nose are cleaned, the face is cleaned, the arms up to the elbow are washed, and the head is wiped over with wet hands, including the ears, before finally the feet are washed. Some authorities hold that intention suffices in the heart, and some require that it be spoken, usually under the breath.

One then lowers one's hands. The first  represents the beginning of prayer. From this point forward one praying may not converse, eat, or do things that are otherwise halal. A Muslim must keep their vision low during prayer, looking at the place where their face will contact the ground during prostration.

Common elements of each 
This chapter begins with praise of God and then a supplication is made to God.

This is followed by saying  and raising the hands up to the ear lobes, before the worshipper kneels and prostrates with the forehead, nose, knees, palms and toes touching the floor, saying . After a short while in prostration, the worshipper very briefly rises to sit, then returns to the ground a second time. In the final phase of az-Zubayr's practice, the middle, ring, and pinky fingers on the right hand are clasped, while the index finger is pointed and the thumb placed above the clasped middle finger. This practice of az-Zubayr's became a basis principle by modern scholars such as Muhammad ibn Abd al-Wahhab in his book, and Muhammad Nasiruddin al-Albani.

Taslim

Taslim is the concluding portion of the salah, where one recites  As-salāmu ʿalaikum wa-raḥmatu-llah ("Peace and blessings of God be unto you") once while facing the right, and once while facing the left.

Types of salah
Prayers in Islam are classified into categories based on degrees of obligation. One common classification is fard ("compulsory"), sunnah ("tradition") and nafl ("voluntary").

Compulsory prayers
The five daily prayers are considered by many to be obligatory on every Muslim who has reached the age of puberty, with the exception of those for whom it may not be possible due to physical or mental disabilities, and those menstruating (hayd) or experiencing postnatal bleeding (nifas). Those who are sick or otherwise physically unable to offer their prayers in the traditional form are permitted to offer their prayers while sitting or lying, as they are able. Each of the five prayers has a prescribed time, depending on the movement of the sun. These are the Fajr prayer (2 rakat, observed at dawn), Zuhr prayer (4 rakat, observed at noon), Asr prayer (4 rakat, observed late in the afternoon), Maghrib prayer (3 rakat, observed after sunset), and the Isha prayer (4 rakat, observed at nighttime). Salah must be prayed in its time. In certain circumstances, one may be unable to offer one's prayer within the prescribed time. In this case, the prayer must be offered as soon as possible. Several hadith narrate that Muhammad stated that it is permissible to pray salah out of its permissible time if a person accidentally sleeps through the prescribed time. However, knowingly sleeping through the prescribed time for Salah is deemed impermissible by most scholars.

Qasr (Shortening Prayers) 
When traveling over long distances, one may shorten the Zuhr, 'Asr and 'Isha'a prayers to 2 rakat, a practice known as qasr.

==== Jam''' (Combining Prayers) ====
In Shia Ja'fari Fiqh, one may perform jam' bayn as-salātayn, which refers to praying the Zuhr and 'Asr prayers in combination at one of its time, as well as the Maghrib and Isha'a prayers at one of its time. However, praying separately is considered better. Neither qasr nor jam' bayn as-salātayn can be applied to the Fajr prayer.

Barring the Hanafites, Sunni jurisprudence also permit to combine Maghrib and 'Isha'a prayers or Dhuhr and 'Asr prayers if they are traveling and incapable of independently performing the prayers. Amongst Sunnis, Salafi Muslims allow the combining of two consecutive prayers for a wide range of reasons; such as when various needs arise or due to any difficulty. Taking precedence from Imams of the Salaf and early Muhaddithun; many Salafis amongst the Ahl-i Hadith school permit combining two consecutive prayers generally, although praying separately is preferred.

 Sunni view 
Of the fard category are the five daily prayers, as well as the Gathering prayer (Jumu'ah), while the Eid prayers and Witr are of the Wajib category. Abandoning the obligatory prayers due to negligence is Kufr (disbelief) according to the stricter Hanbali madhhab of Sunni Islam, while the other Sunni madhhabs consider doing so a major sin. However, all four madhhabs agree that denial of the mandatory status of these prayers invalidates the faith of those who do so, rendering them apostates. The Islamic prophet Muhammad is reported to have said: "Between man and polytheism and unbelief is the abandonment of salat." (Sahih Muslim Book 1, hadith 154).Fard prayers (as with all fard actions) are further classed as either fard al-ayn (obligation of the self) and fard al-kifayah (obligation of sufficiency). Fard al-Ayn are actions considered obligatory on individuals, for which the individual will be held to account if the actions are neglected. Fard al-Kifayah are actions considered obligatory on the Muslim community at large, so that if some people within the community carry it out no Muslim is considered blameworthy, but if no one carries it out, all incur a collective punishment.

Followers of Imam Abu Hanifa also include a 6th obligatory prayer, witr. It is supposed to be the last prayer of the night and is composed of an odd number of rakat. This obligation is considered a lesser obligation to the other 5 obligatory prayers, in that its rejection isn't an act of disbelief according to the Hanafi school. The other schools consider this to be a Sunnah muakkadah (emphasized sunnah).

Some Islamic scholars require men to offer the mandatory salat in congregation (jama'ah), behind an imam when they are able however, according to most Islamic scholars, prayer in congregation is mustahabb (recommended) for men, if they are able to do so.

 Special congregational prayers 

The Jumu'ah is a congregational prayer on Friday, which replaces the Zuhr prayer. It is compulsory upon men to pray this in congregation, while women may pray it so or offer Zuhr prayer instead. Jumu'ah consists of a sermon (khutbah), after which two rakats are prayed. Since the khutbah replaces the two rakat of Zuhr, it is believed that listening to it carefully compensates the thawāb of 2 rakat.

The salah of the 'Idayn is said on the mornings of ''Eid al-Fitr and 'Eid an-nahr. The Eid prayer is classified by some as fard, likely an individual obligation (fard al-ayn) though some Islamic scholars argue it is only a collective obligation (fard al-kifayah). It consists of two rakats, with seven (or three for the followers Imam Abu Hanifa) takbirs offered before the start of the first rakat and five (or three for the followers of Imam Abu Hanifa) before the second. After the salah is completed, a sermon (khutbah) is offered. However, the khutbah is not an integral part of the Eid salah. The Eid salah must be offered between sunrise and true noon i.e. between the time periods for Fajr and Zuhr.

Supererogatory prayers

Sunnah and nafl
Sunni Muslims perform optional sunnah salah (voluntary prayers offered by Muhammad) of two categories: sunnah mu'akkadah (verified sunnah) and sunnah ghair-mu'akkadah (unverified sunnah). The primary difference between the two being the frequency of Muhammad having performed the relevant salah. Certain sunnah prayers have prescribed times. Those ordained for before each of the fard prayers must be offered between the first call to prayer (adhan) and the second call (iqamah), which signifies the start of the fard prayer. Those sunnah ordained for after the fard prayers can be said any time between the end of the fard prayers and the end of the current prayer's waqt.

While Sunni Muslims classify these prayers as sunnah, Shia consider them nafl. Nafl salah are voluntary and can be offered at any time. Many Sunni Muslims also offer two rakats of nafl salah after the Zuhr and Maghrib prayers. During the Isha prayer, they pray the two rakats of nafl after the two sunnah mu'akkadah and wajib prayers. There are many specific conditions or situations when one may wish to offer nafl prayers. They cannot be offered at sunrise, true noon, or sunset. The prohibition against salah at these times is to prevent the practice of sun worship. Some Muslims offer voluntary prayers immediately before and after the five prescribed prayers. A table of these prayers is given below.

 Prayers of the night 

Tahajjud are supererogatory prayers offered late at night. Prayers of this kind are observed from midnight to the prescribed time of the Fajr prayer. The prayer includes any number of even rakat, performed in twos or fours, followed by three or more odd rakat of witr prayer. Shia Muslims offer similar prayers, simply called nightly prayers. These are considered highly meritorious, and can be offered in the same time as tahajjud. These prayers include eleven rakat: 8 nafl (4 prayers of 2 rakat each), 2 rakat shaf' prayer and 1 rakat witr. Witr (Arabic:   'string') are prayers offered either with the Isha prayer or with the tahajjud/salawat al-layl. Some consider this prayer compulsory (wajib), while others consider it supererogatory. These are performed in odd numbers of rakats, with slight differences between madhhabs. The prayer usually includes the qunūt.

Other prayers
The word istikharah is derived from the root ḵ-y-r (خير) "well-being, goodness, choice, selection". Salat al-Istikhaarah is a prayer offered when a Muslim needs guidance on a particular matter. To say this salah one should pray two rakats of non-obligatory salah to completion. After completion one should request God that which on is better. The intention for the salah should be in one's heart to pray two rakats of salah followed by Istikhaarah. The salah can be offered at any of the times where salah is not forbidden. Other prayers include the tahiyyat al-masjid, which Muslims are encouraged to offer these two rakat.

 Differences in practice 

Muslims believe that Muhammad practiced, taught, and disseminated the worship ritual in the whole community of Muslims and made it part of their life. The practice has, therefore, been concurrently and perpetually practiced by the community in each of the generations. The authority for the basic forms of the salah is neither the hadiths nor the Quran, but rather the consensus of Muslims.

This is not inconsistent with another fact that Muslims have shown diversity in their practice since the earliest days of practice, so the salah practiced by one Muslim may differ from another's in minor details. In some cases the Hadith suggest some of this diversity of practice was known of and approved by Muhammad himself.

Most differences arise because of different interpretations of the Islamic legal sources by the different schools of law (madhhabs) in Sunni Islam, and by different legal traditions within Shia Islam. In the case of ritual worship these differences are generally minor, and should rarely cause dispute.

Common differences, which may vary between schools and gender, include the position of legs, feet, hands and fingers, where the eyes should focus, the minimum amount of recitation, the volume of recitation (audible, moving of lips, or just listening), and which of the principal elements of the prayer are indispensable, versus recommended or optional.

A 2015 Pew Research Center study found that women are 2% more likely than men to pray on a daily basis.

Prayer in congregation

Prayer in the congregation (jama'ah) is considered to have more social and spiritual benefits than praying by oneself. As per hadith traditions, the reward of a prayer in congregation increases twenty-five times. A hadith says: "The prayer in congregation is twenty five times superior to the prayer offered by person alone." (Sahih Bukhari 646).

When praying in congregation, the people stand in straight parallel rows behind one person who conducts the prayer, called imam, also called the 'leader'. The imam must be above the rest in knowledge, action, piety, and justness and possess faith and commitment the people trust, Balanced Perception of Religion and the best knowledge of the Quran. The prayer is offered as normal, with the congregation following the imam in order as he/she offers the salah.

Standing arrangement
For two people of the same gender, they would stand in line, the imam would stand on the left, and the other person is on the right. For more than two people, the imam stands one row ahead of the rest.

When the worshippers consist of men and women combined, a man is chosen as the imam. In this situation, women are typically forbidden from assuming this role. This point, though unanimously agreed on by the major schools of Islam, is disputed by some groups, based partly on a hadith'' whose interpretation is controversial. When the congregation consists entirely of women and pre-pubescent children, one woman is chosen as imam. When men, women, and children are praying, the children's rows are usually between the men's and women's rows, with the men at the front and women at the back. Another configuration is where the men's and women's rows are side by side, separated by a curtain or other barrier, with the primary intention being for there to be no direct line of sight between male and female Worshippers.

See also
Dua
Sabr (Islamic term)
Tasbih

References

Footnotes

Notes

Citations

Bibliography

Further reading

External links
 Learn how to Pray Salah
 Islamic Prayer Times: 11 Things You Need to Know
 How to Perform Salah
 Muslim Prayer Times: Calculating Prayer Times in Islam
 The Importance of Salah in Islam

Islamic terminology
 
Prayer